Paulius Paknys (born 10 May 1984, in Vilnius) is a retired Lithuanian footballer. He most recently played for Puszcza Niepołomice in the Polish Second League.

External links
 
 
 

1984 births
Living people
Lithuanian footballers
Association football defenders
Lithuanian expatriate footballers
Expatriate footballers in Belarus
Expatriate footballers in Poland
Expatriate footballers in Azerbaijan
Ekstraklasa players
FC Vilnius players
FK Ekranas players
FK Šilutė players
FK Žalgiris players
FC Shakhtyor Soligorsk players
Stal Stalowa Wola players
Korona Kielce players
Shamakhi FK players
Simurq PIK players
SFK Rotalis players
Kolejarz Stróże players